Bonneuil is a commune in the Indre department in central France. The small village boasts a Manor House or fortified house built in the 15th century and is called La Fortilesse. Jean-Baptiste Rougier de la Bergerie, à Baron of Napoleon's empire, was born in that house on the 4th September 1757. He authored a number of books on agriculture. Today the building is privately owned and has been for sale for a couple of years.

Geography
The river Benaize forms most of the commune's southern border.

Population

See also
Communes of the Indre department

References

Communes of Indre